The 1975 Scheldeprijs was the 62nd edition of the Scheldeprijs cycle race and was held on 29 July 1975. The race was won by Ronald De Witte.

General classification

References

1975
1975 in road cycling
1975 in Belgian sport